Howard Winstone, MBE (15 April 1939 – 30 September 2000) was a Welsh world champion boxer, born in Merthyr Tydfil, Wales. As an amateur, Winstone won the Amateur Boxing Association bantamweight title in 1958, and a Commonwealth Games Gold Medal at the 1958 British Empire and Commonwealth Games in Cardiff.

Boxing style
In his early amateur days Winstone was very much a two-fisted fighter, but as a teenager, whilst working in a local toy factory, he lost the tips of three fingers on his right hand in an accident. As a result, he lost much of the punching power in his right hand and so had to change his style to rely much more on a straight left.

Amateur career
Winstone won 83 of his 86 amateur fights, and in 1958 he was the ABA bantamweight champion.

Representing Wales at the 1958 British Empire and Commonwealth Games in Cardiff, Winstone won the gold medal at bantamweight. Winstone won the first of his three BBC Wales Sports Personality of the Year awards the same year (1958) – winning his second in 1963 and his third in 1967.

Professional career

Winstone turned professional in 1959 and was managed by former European welterweight champion, Eddie Thomas.

Winstone made his professional debut in February 1959 at Wembley Stadium, London, when he beat Billy Graydon on points over six rounds. He then proceeded to win his first 24 fights, at which point he was considered ready for a shot at the British featherweight title.

In May 1961 he fought Terry Spinks the holder of the British featherweight title at the Empire Pool, Wembley. He out-boxed Spinks, forcing him to retire after ten rounds, and so claimed the British title.

He continued to win all his contests and in April 1962 he defended his title against Derry Treanor, at the Empire Pool, winning by a technical knockout in the fourteenth round. The next month he defended his title against Harry Carroll in Cardiff forcing him to retire after six rounds.

His first defeat came in November 1962 his 35th fight after 34 straight wins. He was beaten by Leroy Jeffery, an American featherweight, by a technical knockout in the second round after having been knocked down three times.

In January 1963, he defended his British title for the third time, defeating Johnny Morrisey by a technical knockout in the eleventh, in Glasgow.

In July 1963, he challenged for the European featherweight title, fighting Italian holder, Alberto Serti in Cardiff. Winstone won the title when the referee stopped the fight in the fourteenth round.

One month later he defended both titles against Billy Calvert in Porthcawl, winning on points over fifteen rounds. In December 1963 he again defended his titles against John O'Brien, again winning on points.

In January 1964 he suffered only his second defeat in 45 fights, losing to the American, Don Johnson.

In May 1964 he defended his European title against Italian, Lino Mastellaro at the Empire Pool, winning by a technical knockout in the Eighth round.

In January 1965 he defended his European title again, against Frenchman, Yves Desmarets in Rome. He won on points over fifteen rounds.

World title fights
In September 1965 he challenged for the WBA and WBC world featherweight titles held by the Mexican southpaw, Vicente Saldivar. The fight was held at Earls Court Arena, London and Saldivar won on points over fifteen rounds.

In March 1966 he defended his European title against Andrea Silanos in Italy winning by a technical knockout in the fifteenth round. In September 1966 he defended it against Belgian, Jean de Keers at Wembley and won on a technical knockout in three rounds.

In December 1966 he defended his British and European titles against the Welsh featherweight, Lennie Williams, defeating him at Port Talbot in eight rounds.

In June 1967 he was ready for another world title challenge against Vicente Saldivar, this time in Cardiff, but again lost on points, although the decision favoured Saldivar by only half a point.

Four months later, in October 1967, he fought Saldivar again, this time in Mexico City, but lost after being knocked down in the seventh and twelfth rounds. His manager threw in the towel in the twelfth.

After his latest successful defence, Saldivar announced his retirement leaving his world title vacant. In January 1968, Winstone fought the Japanese, Mitsunori Seki for the vacant WBC world featherweight title at the Royal Albert Hall. He won when the fight was stopped in the ninth due to a cut eye, and so finally gained a world title. Saldivar was in the audience to see his vacated title won by his old rival.

In July 1968 he defended his newly won world title against the Cuban, Jose Legra, at Porthcawl, Wales. Although Winstone had beaten Legra twice before, he was knocked down twice in the first round. He continued fighting, but unfortunately he sustained a badly swollen left eye, which caused the bout to be stopped in the fifth round. Having lost the world title in his first defence, Winstone decided to retire at the age of 29.

Retirement

He continued living in Merthyr Tydfil after retirement. In 1968 he was awarded the MBE. Later, he was made a Freeman of Merthyr Tydfil due to his boxing accomplishments. He died from kidney disease on 30 September 2000, aged 61.

In 2001, one year after his death, a bronze statue of Winstone by Welsh sculptor David Petersen was unveiled in St. Tydfil's Square, Merthyr Tydfil.

In 2005, he beat Owen Money, Richard Trevithick, Joseph Parry and Lady Charlotte Guest to be named "Greatest Citizen of Merthyr Tydfil", in a public vote competition run by Cyfarthfa Castle and Museum as part of the centenary celebrations to mark Merthyr's incorporation as a county borough in 1905.

His brother, Glyn Winstone continues to run a café business in the town's bus station under the boxing-themed trading-style "The Lonsdale Bar".

Film

The life of Howard Winstone was made into a feature film called Risen Starring British actor Stuart Brennan as Howard Winstone which was released in 2011.

See also
 List of Welsh boxing world champions
 List of British featherweight boxing champions

References

Bibliography

Further reading

 Maurice Golesworthy, Encyclopaedia of Boxing (Eighth Edition) (1988), Robert Hale Limited, 
 
 
 
 
 
 
 
 

1939 births
2000 deaths
Sportspeople from Merthyr Tydfil
Welsh male boxers
World boxing champions
World Boxing Council champions
Commonwealth Games gold medallists for Wales
Featherweight boxers
World featherweight boxing champions
Boxers at the 1958 British Empire and Commonwealth Games
Members of the Order of the British Empire
Commonwealth Games medallists in boxing
Medallists at the 1958 British Empire and Commonwealth Games